Neil Kensington Adam  (5 November 1891 – 19 July 1973) was a British chemist.

Education
Adam was born in Cambridge, the first of three children of James Adam (1860–1907), a Classics don, and his classicist wife Adela Marion (née Kensington) (1866–1944). His sister Barbara was a noted sociologist and criminologist, while his brother Captain Arthur Innes Adam was killed in France on 16 September 1916. His maternal uncle was Sir Alfred Kensington, a judge in the Chief Court of the Punjab.

Adam was educated at Winchester College, and then studied chemistry at Trinity College, Cambridge, where he later became a fellow (1915–1923). He graduated BA in 1913, received his MA in 1919, and Sc.D in 1928.

Career
During the First World War, he served at the Royal Naval Air Service airship station at Kingsnorth, Kent, working on problems associated with rubber-proofing fabric for airships, and other chemical problems.

Adam was Sorby Research Fellow at the University of Sheffield from 1921 to 1929, then a Research Associate (1930–1936) and Lecturer (1936–1937) at University College London. He was Professor of Chemistry at the University of Southampton from 1937 until 1957.

Personal life
Adam was married to Winifred Wright; they were active Christian Scientists. Adam died, aged 81, in Southampton.

Publications

References

External links
 

1891 births
1973 deaths
People from Cambridge
20th-century British chemists
People educated at Winchester College
Alumni of Trinity College, Cambridge
Academics of University College London
Academics of the University of Southampton
British Christian Scientists
Royal Naval Air Service personnel of World War I
Fellows of the Royal Society